Michael Lyle “Mikey” Anderson (born May 25, 1999) is an American professional ice hockey defenseman for the Los Angeles Kings of the National Hockey League (NHL).

Playing career
Anderson was drafted 103rd overall in the 2017 NHL Entry Draft by the Los Angeles Kings. On April 23, 2019, he signed a three-year, entry-level contract with the Kings. Anderson was called up to the Kings on February 28, 2020 and made his NHL debut the following day against the New Jersey Devils. Anderson scored his first NHL goal on March 9, 2020, against the Colorado Avalanche in a 3–1 win.

Personal life
Anderson's older brother, Joey, is a forward for the Toronto Maple Leafs. Mikey played football and hockey growing up but stuck with hockey long term. The brothers skated against each other in Mikey's NHL debut. Anderson's sister, Sami, played hockey at the College of St. Scholastica.

Career statistics

Regular season and playoffs

International

References

External links
 

1999 births
American men's ice hockey defensemen
Ice hockey players from Minnesota
Living people
Los Angeles Kings draft picks
Los Angeles Kings players
Minnesota Duluth Bulldogs men's ice hockey players
People from Fridley, Minnesota
Ontario Reign (AHL) players
Waterloo Black Hawks players